It's Her Day is a 2016 Nigerian comedy drama film about an engaged couple from different social backgrounds, and the class struggle they encounter while planning their high-end wedding. Bovi Ugboma plays Victor, the newly engaged bachelor who takes it upon himself to give his materialistic fiancée, Nicole (Ini Dima-Okojie) a fairy tale wedding despite his reservations. The film was produced by Bovi Ugboma and directed by Aniedi Anwah, and premiered on 9 September 2016 in Lagos, Nigeria.

Synopsis
Victor (Bovi Ugboma) arrives home from the UK to marry his fiancée, the spoilt and pampered Nicole Hernandez (Ini Dima-Okojie) who wastes no time planning the fairytale wedding of her dreams. With Nicole's snooty mother (Shaffy Bello) meddling over every detail of the pending occasion, Victor finds the total cost is far beyond his budget. Despite repeated warnings from his best friend Omonigho (Gregory Ojefua) whom Nicole loathes, along with his Warri-based family, most notably his no-nonsense aunt Foweh (Najite Dede) who has an unfavourable opinion of her nephew's fiancée's family, Victor is left with no choice other than to please Nicole and her equally demanding sisters Stacey (Toni Tones), Nancy (Amanda Mike-Ebeye), and Augusta (Thelma Ezeamaka). With the help of high-end wedding planner Caroline (Adunni Ade), the Hernandez' arrange every outline of Nicole's big day—guests, reception, menu, entertainers, photographers—while Victor's own suggestions are either ignored or ridiculed.

Trouble ensues at the couple's native wedding ceremony when Victor sprays his bride with naira notes instead of dollar bills; the couple fall out when Nicole accuses him of embarrassing her family and cheapening her status. Victor later apologises, but the bridezilla demands persist. He also regrets breaking up with Angela, the ex-girlfriend he cut ties with after his move to the UK, and attempts to win her back. However, she can see through his facade, and advices him to desist from keeping up appearances for clout lest his hypocrisy delivers harmful consequences. At a pre-marriage counselling session, Victor and Nicole invoke chaos when the latter seizes Nicole's phone when she pays more attention to Candy Crush than she does the counsellor. He breaks up with her, a move Omonigho approves, but upon discovering Angela is now in a new relationship, Victor returns to Nicole.

Victor recruits his friends to stand in as decoys via a phone conversation with the Hernandez' after they insist on booking celebrity artists to perform at the wedding, including Davido, Wizkid, and Timi Dakolo. A stag party is held, and the next morning Victor, hungover from the night before, is horrified that he is late for his own wedding. His groomsmen worsen the situation by hiring kekes to take him and his groomsmen to the church to fulfil an old pact. They arrive in the kekes during Mrs Hernandez' interview with HipTV, causing her embarrassment live on TV. At the ceremony, Victor, upon realising Nicole will forever remain a spoilt ungrateful snob after she rejects his ring, calls off the wedding in front of his guests and storms out of the church, his friends in tow.

Victor and his groomsmen arrive at Angela's house from the church and beg her to consider rekindling her old relationship. Although she accepts his apology, Angela has not forgotten the hurt she endured after he left her for Nicole, and chases them away with a whip.

Cast
Bovi Ugboma as Victor Elomena/Victor Smith
Ini Dima-Okojie as Nicole Hernandez
 Shaffy Bello as Mrs Hernandez
 Toni Tones as Stacy Hernandez
 Thelma Ezeamaka as Augusta Hernandez 
 Amanda Mike-Ebeye as Nancy Hernandez
 Adunni Ade as Caroline, wedding planner
 Najite Dede as Aunty Foweh
 Gregory Ojefua as Omonigho
 Femi Durojaiye as Dede
 Ese Lami George as Victoria 
 Omoni Oboli as Angela

Production
The film is produced by Bovi Ugboma. Directed by Aniedi Anwah.
In Kountry Kulture Network, distributed by Silverbird Distribution.

Release
The movie premiered in Lagos, Nigeria on 9 September.

References

External links
 

English-language Nigerian films
Films directed by Kemi Adetiba
Films about weddings
Films set in Lagos
Films shot in Lagos
2016 romantic comedy-drama films
Nigerian romantic comedy-drama films
2016 films
2016 comedy films
2016 drama films
2010s English-language films